Chris Seelbach may refer to:

 Chris Seelbach (politician) (born 1979), American politician in Cincinnati
 Chris Seelbach (baseball) (born 1972), former Major League Baseball pitcher